Seeta Qasemi also spelled as Seeta Qasemie is an Afghan singer-songwriter. She entered the Afghan music scene in 2008. She sings both in Pashto and Dari and lives in Germany.

Early life
Seeta Qasemi wanted to be a footballer when growing up. Due to the civil war going on in Afghanistan, Seeta had to leave her country. Qasemi family moved to Pakistan where she stayed before marrying at the age of 25.

Career

Seeta's career started by performing at small functions with renowned singers from the music scene such as Jawid Sharif and others. At one of these functions, Seeta met Valy Hedjasi who was a camera man. Valy had asked Seeta if she was interested in collaborating. Seeta composed, wrote and sung the songs "Bia Tu" and "Dilbare Mehrabanam". After this, Qasemi released her single "Ba Taswiram". Following this, Qasemie had established herself as an Afghan singer.

Seeta's first commercial success came with the song "Dukhtare Kuchi", which was based on a love story between an Afghan nomad girl and boy. She followed this up with her next song "Mastam Mast". Qasemi's collaboration with Shafiq Mureed was Seeta's first Pashto song and she was praised for her well versed accent and the video, Ta Sara Meena Larem. The song was shot inside Afghanistan, depicting a love story between an Afghan villager and an Afghan girl from the west who visits the village. Another collaboration followed with Shafiq Mureed, "Lamba Di Shoma". Seeta followed this up with a Pashto Na`at song and featured in Shafiq Mureed's 'Da Afghanistan' video clip alongside Mozhdah Jamalzadah. While Qasemi stayed in Afghanistan, she gave a series of concerts and interviews. Her next hit was the Hazaragi song 'Watandar'. On international woman's day Seeta released her song "Zan".

Unlike many other music artists, Seeta made her television debut with a charity show. During the month of Ramadan, Seeta visited families in need with a camera crew to let them tell their personal stories and experiences. The show provided the families with assistance such as food and was aired on Khurshid.

Discography

References

Living people
People from Kabul
Afghan Tajik people
Afghan women singers
Persian-language singers
21st-century women singers
Afghan expatriates in Germany
21st-century Afghan women singers
Date of birth missing (living people)
1979 births